In Kyiv there are two botanical gardens:
 A.V. Fomin Botanical Garden, or Kyiv University's Botanical Garden;
 M.M. Gryshko National Botanical Garden